The 2008 Speedway Grand Prix of Czech Republic was the sixth race of the 2008 Speedway Grand Prix season. It took place on August 2 in the Marketa Stadium in Prague, Czech Republic.

Czech Republic SGP was won by current World Champion Nicki Pedersen from Denmark. It was his first GP Won in this season.

Riders 

The Speedway Grand Prix Commission nominated Luboš Tomíček as a wild card, and Adrian Rymel and Filip Šitera both as track reserves. The draw was made on July 22 at the FIM Headquarters in Mies, Switzerland.

Heat details

Heat after heat 
 (63.34) Iversen, Harris, Kasprzak, Tomicek
 (63.28) Adams, Gollob, Holta, B.Pedersen (Fx)
 (62.73) N.Pedersen, Crump, Lindgren, Dryml
 (64.98) Hancock, Andersen, Jonsson, Nicholls
 (63.88) Andersen, Holta, Lindgren, Harris
 (63.15) Adams, N.Pedersen, Nicholls, Iversen
 (63.28) Jonsson, B.Pedersen, Dryml, Kasprzak
 (63.06) Crump, Gollob, Hancock, Tomicek
 (63.95) Hancock, Dryml, Harris, Adams
 (63.86) Crump, Jonsson, Iversen, Holta (Fx)
 (64.49) Gollob, Nicholls, Lindgren, Kasprzak
 (63.36) N.Pedersen, B.Pedersen, Andersen, Tomicek
 (63.99) Harris, Crump, Nicholls, B.Pedersen
 (64.72) Gollob, Iversen, Andersen, Dryml
 (63.98) N.Pedersen, Holta, Hancock, Kasprzak
 (64.01) Adams, Jonsson, Lindgren, Tomicek
 (65.85) N.Pedersen, Gollob, Harris, Jonsson
 (64.24) B.Pedersen, Hancock, Iversen, Lindgren
 (64.78) Crump, Andersen, Adams, Kasprzak
 (64.39) Holta, Nicholls, Dryml, Tomicek
 Semi-Finals:
 (63.87) Andersen, N.Pedersen, Jonsson, Adams
 (64.81) Hancock, Crump, Holta, Gollob
 Final:
 (63.86) N.Pedersen (6 points), Andersen (4), Crump (2), Hancock (0)

The intermediate classification

See also 
 Speedway Grand Prix
 List of Speedway Grand Prix riders

References

External links 
 www.SpeedwayWorld.tv

Czech Republic
Speedway Grand Prix of Czech Republic